The Southern Nigeria Government Gazette was the government gazette for the Colony and Protectorate of Southern Nigeria. It was published at Lagos between 1907 and 1913.

It replaced the Government Gazette of the Protectorate of Southern Nigeria and was continued by The Nigeria Gazette.

See also
List of British colonial gazettes

References

External links
Nigeria official publications at the British Library

Publications established in 1907
Publications disestablished in 1913
Colonial Nigeria
History of Nigeria
Government gazettes of Nigeria